Swanky Tunes (stylized as SWΛNKУ TUИES) are a Russian electronic dance music trio composed of Vadim Shpak, Dmitry Burykin and Stanislav Zaytsev, formed in Smolensk in 1998. Prior to 2012, they have collaborated closely with another Russian EDM duo, Hard Rock Sofa. They were ranked number 97 of the DJ Mag charts in 2015.

The trio owns the label Showland, sub-label Armada Music (2015–2018), and has a weekly podcast of the same name.

Biography
The group was formed in 1998, experimenting with different electronic styles in search of their own sound. At first, they mixed techno sounds with vintage synthesizers. Then the group morphed makes a sound clearly influenced by the big beat. Currently, some touches of techno, 80s electro, and progressive contemporary house complement their sound. At its inception, the band has a name in Russian, but in 1999 they decided to adapt to the English language, as it would be a more accessible name for the market.

Their debut album, Streamline, was released in 2006 by the Russian label Uplifto Records. In 2006 and 2007, they were named "Best Musical Group" for the Dance Music Awards in Russia. Currently they hold the #14 among the top 100 DJs of Russia.

Internationally, its productions and remixes have been released by labels from the likes of MixMash, Spinnin' Records, Refune, Size, Wall, Musical Freedom and Doorn Records. They also had the support from major artists of electronic music such as Tiësto, David Guetta, Sander Van Doorn, Swedish House Mafia, Laidback Luke, Dirty South and Avicii, among others.

Very often they releases productions in collaboration Hard Rock Sofa, another Russian musical trio, which one of its members, Alexander Shapovalov is a cousin of a member of Swanky Tunes, Vadim Shpak. In 2011, both groups released an electronic version of The Stooges song, "I Wanna Be Your Dog". In the same year, they collaborated with Dutch DJ R3hab on the song "Sending My Love" with the vocals of Max'C. In 2012, they collaborated with renowned DJ and producer Tiësto, production "Make Some Noise", including the record compiled by him, Club Life: Volume Two Miami. In September 2012, they founded their own record label Showland, which was distributed by the Dutch label Spinnin' Records, being its first release, the single "Blood Rush".

In November 2017, Swanky Tunes released their Get Swanky EP, including four tracks. According to the artists: "Get Swanky EP reveals Swanky Tunes as multi genre producers. It covers not just club music genres, but goes deeper into pop and dance music."

Awards and nominations

Discography

Albums
Studio albums
 2006: Streamline [Uplifto Records]

Compilations
 2009: All About Us [TME]

Charting singles

Singles
2018
 "Drop It" [Spinnin' Premium]
 "Day By Day" (featuring LP) [Effective Records]
 "Rooftop Party" (with Dirtcaps) [Revealed Music]
 "In the Club" [Hexagon]
"Collusion" (with Morgan Page) [Armada Music]
"Диджей" (with Elena Temnikova) [Effective Records]

2019
"Virus" [Protocol Recordings]
"Supersonic" (featuring Christian Burns) [Spinnin' Records]
 "U Got Me Burning" [Hysteria Records]
"Take Me Away" [Hub Records]
"Blow" [Hussle Recordings]
"I'll Live On" (featuring Jantine) [Effective Records]
"Sugar" (with George Fletcher) [Effective Records / Klever Label]
"Game Time" (with Nssnd and LexBlaze) [Protocol Recordings]
"Moonlight" (with Ya Rick) [Coffee House Records]
"You Don't Know Me" [Future House Music]

2020
"Over & Over" [Kontor Records]
"The Illest" [Mixmash Records]
"Offbeat" [Smash The House]
"Own The Night" (with Jac & Harri) [Revealed Music]
"Tired" [Sony Music]
"Better Now" (with Teddy Cream) [Hussle Recordings]
"Love Yourself" (with Going Deeper) [Musical Freedom]
"No Problems" [Generation Hex]

2021
"Your Love" [Hexagon]

2022
"Style" [Revealed Music]
"I Love The Way You Move" [Hysteria Records]

References

Notes
 A  Translates to "DJ" from Russian.

Sources

External links
 

Russian DJs
Russian house musicians
Russian electronic music groups
Electro house musicians
Armada Music artists
Electronic dance music DJs